Kiari Kendrell Cephus (born December 14, 1991), known professionally as Offset, is an American rapper. He rose to prominence as part of the rap group Migos, alongside his cousin Quavo, and his late first cousin once removed Takeoff. In 2017, Offset released the collaborative album Without Warning, alongside 21 Savage and record producer Metro Boomin. The album spawned the single "Ric Flair Drip", which reached the top 20 on the Billboard Hot 100 chart. He would also appear on Metro Boomin's single "No Complaints" with Drake. In 2018, he was featured on the song "Taste" by Tyga, which marked his first top ten on the Billboard Hot 100 as a soloist, and was later certified 7× Platinum by the Recording Industry Association of America (RIAA).

That same year, he appeared on Kodak Black's single "Zeze" alongside Travis Scott, which reached number two on the Billboard Hot 100 chart. In 2019, Offset released his debut solo studio album Father of 4. The album became his second album as a soloist to reach the top ten on the Billboard 200 chart; and spawned the single "Clout" featuring his wife Cardi B, which earned him a Grammy Award for Best Rap Performance nomination.

Career
Offset was featured as a backup dancer in the video for "Whatchulookinat" by Whitney Houston in 2002. He was 9 years old at the time. A clip of it is shown on the Late Late Show with James Corden in June 2021.
The members of Migos were raised middle-class in suburban Gwinnett County, Georgia. In 2008, Offset formed Migos with Quavo and Takeoff. Offset is Quavo's cousin, and Quavo is Takeoff's uncle. The three grew up together in Gwinnett County, a mostly suburban area near Atlanta.

Migos initially gained recognition following the release of their 2013 single "Versace". In 2015, the trio released their debut studio album Yung Rich Nation. In 2017, their single "Bad and Boujee" became an Internet phenomenon, spawning many memes with the lyrics "rain drop, drop top", which were performed by Offset. The song peaked at number one on the US Billboard Hot 100 chart, with many critics believing Offset commanded the track. In 2017, the trio released their second studio album, Culture, which debuted at number one on the US Billboard 200 chart.

In addition to Migos, Offset has released solo music and collaborated with numerous artists. In June 2017, he was featured on Metro Boomin's single "No Complaints" alongside Drake, which peaked at number 71 on the Billboard Hot 100, and in September he joined Macklemore on the song "Willy Wonka", from the album Gemini. Offset would eventually release a collaborative studio album with rapper 21 Savage and record producer Metro Boomin titled, Without Warning. The album was released on October 31, 2017, and debuted at number 4 on the US Billboard 200 chart. It spawned the hit song "Ric Flair Drip", Offset's first solo platinum single, and highest charting US Billboard Hot 100 entry as a lead artist to date. On February 22, 2019, he released his first solo album Father of 4. The album featured the single "Clout", with Cardi B, which peaked at the top 40 of the Hot 100 at number 39.

Following the release of the fourth Migos album, Culture III in June 2021, Offset was featured on the soundtrack of Fast & Furious 9 on the song "Hit Em Hard" along with  Trippie Redd, Kevin Gates, Lil Durk and King Von.

In May 2022, rumors surrounding a possible disbandment of Migos arose when Offset and his wife Cardi B unfollowed Quavo  and Takeoff after the latter announced their new duo project, Unc And Phew and released the single Hotel Lobby (Unc & Phew).

In August 2022, Offset announced his second studio album and released two new singles, "54321" and "Code" with Moneybagg Yo, along with the music video featuring model Bella Hadid. Shortly after the release of "54321", Offset filed a lawsuit against his record label Quality Control Music in a dispute over rights to his solo music. His legal team said that he "paid handsomely" for his solo artist rights following the negotiation last year, but now QC has allegedly attempted to claim his latest track as its own.

In October 2022, disbandment of Migos became the subject of speculation based on reports that Offset had slept with Quavo's ex-girlfriend Saweetie. Following this, Quavo and Takeoff released a collaborative album titled Only Built for Infinity Links on October 7, 2022, without Offset's input despite no formal split. In an interview, Quavo stated that he would like to see his and Takeoff's career "as a duo".

On November 1, 2022, Takeoff was shot dead at the 810 Billiards & Bowling in Houston, Texas. Following the murder of his cousin and groupmate, Offset delayed the release date of his upcoming album which was originally going to be released on November 11, 2022.

Other ventures
Dancing was his true calling before rap, the entertainment business called him to the stage and withdrew him from his dancing shoes. In 2016, Offset (including Migos) appeared in an episode of Donald Glover's series Atlanta. The episode aired on September 13, 2016, under the title "Go For Broke". He has also starred in campaigns for the fashion designers Gosha Rubchinskiy, Bryce Barnes, and Lavati.

In February 2019, Offset made his debut on Sean Evans' YouTube series Hot Ones.

In August 2019, it was announced that Offset invested in Esports organization FaZe Clan. Commenting on the investment he said "I love gaming and Esports is the future" said Offset in a release, "These two facts make it only right that I be a part of the biggest Esports organization with some of the best players in the world." He appeared in two FaZe Clan videos on YouTube.

Offset made his acting debut in NCIS: Los Angeles

Offset has helped struggling artists by jointing Axis Replay in 2020.

Offset lost his grandmother to bladder cancer in 2012. He raised $500,000 for the American Cancer Society.

Controversies
In January 2018, Offset was criticized for rapping a line that includes the lyrics "I cannot vibe with queers" in his feature on YFN Lucci's "Boss Life". After the lyric was understood as homophobic he apologized saying he did not intend for his use of the term "queer" to be directed at the LGBT community. His wife, Cardi B, said that Offset did not know the term "queer" had a homophobic history. He has since claimed in an Instagram post that he assumed the lyric was using the definition of "queer" that is defined as eccentric and odd.

Legal issues

When Migos first rose to prominence in 2013, Offset was incarcerated in Georgia's DeKalb County Jail for violating his probation that he had received due to prior felony convictions for burglary and theft.

On April 18, 2015, authorities stopped a Migos concert at Georgia Southern University and arrested all three members of the group, as well as several members of their entourage. Offset was denied bond and was charged with possession of an unspecified Schedule II narcotic, possession of marijuana, possession of a firearm in a school safety zone and possession of a firearm during the commission of a crime.

On May 2, 2015, Offset, while in custody, was charged with battery and inciting a riot within a penal facility after attacking another inmate, causing severe injury. In a bond hearing before Bulloch County Superior Court Judge John R. Turner on May 8, 2015, Offset was formally denied bond based on his prior criminal record as well as the jail fight. During the hearing, two members of Migos' entourage were also denied bonds while four others were granted bonds and were barred from returning to Bulloch County, Georgia as a condition of their release. Judge Turner directed the four who were released not to make contact with anyone involved in the case. Offset's attorney argued that the rap trio were unfairly profiled by law enforcement and that officers had failed to prove ownership of the firearms and illicit drugs found within the two vans. The prosecution responded that law enforcement were present at the concert for the safety of the students and public at-large due to Migos' history of violence. Upon hearing the decision, Offset shouted profanities as he was escorted out of the courtroom.

After eight months in custody, Offset was released on December 4, 2015, after accepting an Alford plea deal. The deal dropped the gun, drug, and gang-related charges in exchange for pleading guilty to inciting a riot within a penal facility, paying a $1,000 fine, serving five years probation, and being banished from Bulloch, Effingham, Jenkins, and Screven counties.

On March 17, 2016, Offset was arrested for driving with a suspended license but was released the next day without charges being filed.

On April 23, 2019, Offset faced a felony charge for possession of three handguns and the possession of drugs from a previous arrest in July 2018.

On October 24, 2020, Offset was detained by the Beverly Hills Police Department near a Donald Trump rally for carrying a concealed weapon. However, he was shortly released.

In 2021, Offset was sued by Platinum Transportation Group, a Los Angeles based car rental company. Offset reportedly rented a Bentley Bentayga from the company in May 2020, pushed back the return date multiple times, and after July 4, claimed the car was gone and had no idea where it was. According to PTG, Offset failed to provide any rational explanations regarding his failure to return the rental, and ceased rental payments after July 25.

Feuds
Offset was involved in a feud with Chris Brown whom he threatened to fight with in 2019.

Personal life
In 2017, Offset started dating fellow rapper Cardi B. They married privately on September 20, 2017. They staged a public proposal the next month at a live performance at Power 99's Powerhouse in Philadelphia. In 2017, he was involved in a cheating scandal with groupie Celina Powell. Powell claimed to be pregnant with his baby. However, Powell later admitted it was a fake pregnancy to try to break their relationship.

In May 2018, he was injured in a car crash. He revealed he almost died in his green Dodge Challenger.

On April 7, 2018, Cardi B revealed on Saturday Night Live that the two were expecting their first child. On December 5, 2018, Cardi B announced on Instagram that she and Offset had broken up, after Offset allegedly had cheated on her during her pregnancy. Offset cheated on her with an aspiring rapper and model named Summer Bunni. He asked her and American rapper Cuban Doll for a threesome in leaked text messages. Offset was involved in another cheating scandal with 6ix9ine’s girlfriend Jade in 2018. In 2018, Cardi B attacked two bartenders named Jade and Baddie G at a strip club. She accused Jade for sleeping with her husband Offset. Cardi B was charged with assault. The couple recorded and released the song "Clout", in 2019. In September 2020, it was reported that Cardi B had filed for divorce, but the next month they were said to be back together.

In 2020, Offset's great uncle died of COVID-19.

On June 27, 2021, Offset and Cardi B announced they were expecting their second child together. Cardi B gave birth to their second child, a son.

On November 1, 2022, Offset’s groupmate and cousin, Takeoff was shot and killed in Houston, Texas.

Offset is the father of five children by four different women, the first four appear in the cover art for his album Father of 4 (2019):
 Jordan Cephus, son born to Justine Watson (2009)
 Kody Cephus, son born to Oriel Jamie (2015)
 Kalea Marie Cephus, daughter born to Shya L'Amour (2015)
 Kulture Kiari Cephus, daughter born to Cardi B (2018)
 Wave Set Cephus, son born to Cardi B (2021)

Discography

Studio albums
 Father of 4 (2019)

Collaborative albums
 Without Warning  (2017)

Filmography

Awards and nominations

Notes

References

External links

 

1991 births
Living people
21st-century African-American male singers
21st-century American rappers
African-American businesspeople
African-American male rappers
African-American male singer-songwriters
Cardi B
FaZe Clan
Migos members
People convicted of battery
People from Lawrenceville, Georgia
People who entered an Alford plea
Quality Control artists
Rappers from Georgia (U.S. state)
Singer-songwriters from Georgia (U.S. state)
Southern hip hop musicians